Trox clathratus is a species of hide beetle in the subfamily Troginae. Within the genus Trox, it is placed in the subgenus Granulitrox.

References

clathratus
Beetles described in 1861